Facial care is the maintenance of the face and its features such as the skin, lips and eyelashes so that it has an attractive, youthful appearance.

References

Beauty
Care